Marshall Islands elects on the national level a head of state – the president – and a legislature. The president is elected for a four-year term by the parliament. The Legislature (Nitijela) has 33 members, elected for a four-year term in single-seat and five multi-seat constituencies. The Legislature was last elected in 2019 without the participation of parties, though part of the members could be members of the United Democratic Party. The Marshall Islands is a state in which political parties have not been active.

There have been a number of local and national elections since the Republic of the Marshall Islands was founded.  The United Democratic Party, running on a reform platform, won the 1999 parliamentary election, taking control of the presidency and cabinet. The new government has publicly confirmed its commitment to an independent judiciary.

The first two presidents were chiefs. Kessai Note is a commoner.

Political parties

Traditionally there have been no formally organized political parties; what has existed more closely resembles factions or interest groups because they do not have party headquarters, formal platforms, or party structures; the following two "groupings" have competed in legislative balloting in recent years - Kabua Party (Imata Kabua) and the United Democratic Party (UDP) (Litokwa Tomeing).

Latest election

See also
 Government of the Marshall Islands
 Politics of the Marshall Islands
 List of presidents of the Marshall Islands
 Electoral calendar
 Electoral system

External links
 Adam Carr's Election Archive